Sarah Morris (born 1967) is a British artist.

Sarah Morris may also refer to:

Sarah Morris, a character in the 2014 film Ouija
Sarah Morris (skier) represented Great Britain at the 1998 Winter Paralympics
Sarah Morris (synchronized swimmer), participated in 2004 Oceania Swimming Championships

See also
Sarah Jane Morris (disambiguation)